Ministrymon azia, the gray ministreak, is a butterfly in the family Lycaenidae. It is found from the southern United States to southern Brazil, Paraguay and Argentina. It is found in virtually all lowland habitats, ranging from deserts in coastal Peru and Chile to rainforests in the Amazon basin.

The wingspan is 16–24 mm. The wings are gray. There is a narrow postmedian line of orange bordered with white on the underside of the hindwings. Adults are on wing from March to September in Florida and Texas, but year-round in most of the tropics. Adults feed on the nectar of various flowers, including Leucaena leucocephala, Melilotus alba, Cynoglossum amabile, Bidens alba, Turnera ulmifolia, Mimosa pudica and Acacia species.

The larvae feed on the flowers of a wide variety of Fabaceae, including Acacia, Mimosa (including M. malacophylla) and Leucaena species (including L. leucocephala), as well as Lysiloma bahamensis.

References

Eumaeini
Butterflies of Central America
Butterflies of the Caribbean
Butterflies of North America
Lycaenidae of South America
Butterflies described in 1873
Taxa named by William Chapman Hewitson